Dumont is an unincorporated community in King County, Texas, United States. It lies in the far northwestern corner of the county, near the Dickens County line. As of the 2000 census, the population was estimated to be 85, making it the second largest community in the sparsely populated county, behind the county seat of Guthrie.

History
Dumont was founded sometime in the late 1880s and named after the first postmaster of the nearby community of Paducah. By 1896 three churches served Dumont's fifty or so residents, and in 1914 schools from 2 neighboring communities consolidated to form Dumont Independent School District #1, which remained intact until 1959 when it was consolidated with Guthrie schools.

Though it has served as a minor center for shipping and commerce for several area ranches, the town has never been highly populated, reaching a high mark of 105 residents in 1960. By 1980 this had fallen to 95, and in 1990 Dumont reportedly had 3 businesses in operation and a population of 85, a figure it maintained through to the 2000 Census.

Education
Dumont is served by the Guthrie Common School District.

Climate
According to the Köppen Climate Classification system, Dumont has a semi-arid climate, abbreviated "BSk" on climate maps.

References

Handbook of Texas Online entry for Dumont

Unincorporated communities in Texas
Unincorporated communities in King County, Texas